The Col de Porte (elevation ) is a mountain pass situated in the Chartreuse Mountains in the  Isère department of France, between Le Sappey-en-Chartreuse to the south and Saint-Pierre-de-Chartreuse to the north. It sits on the D512 between Grenoble and Chambéry, and prior to 1998 was often crossed in conjunction with the Col du Cucheron and the Col du Granier.

To the east is Chamechaude, the highest summit in the Chartreuse Massif. There is a small ski resort situated near the col.

Cycle racing
The Col de Porte is regularly used in the Critérium du Dauphiné. In the sixth stage of the 1977 Critérium, Bernard Hinault fell on the descent from the Col de Porte leading to Grenoble when he was alone in the lead, 1'40" ahead of his competitors. Despite the fall, he won the stage at Bastille in Grenoble ahead of Lucien Van Impe and Bernard Thévenet.

Details of the climb

Tour de France
The pass was first included in the Tour de France in 1907, after which it was used in the next three tours, and then not again until 1947.

Appearances in Tour de France since 1947
Since 1947, the passages which have been categorized have been:

References

Mountain passes of Auvergne-Rhône-Alpes
Isère